Aedes (Finlaya) pseudomediofasciatus is a species complex of mosquito belonging to the genus Aedes. It is found in Sri Lanka, and India. They are known to live around betel plantations. It is a vector of Wuchereria bancrofti.

References

External links
First description of the immature stages of Aedes (Verrallina) pseudomediofasciatus and Ae. yerburyi (Diptera: Culicidae).
Spread, establishment & prevalence of dengue vector Aedes aegypti (L.) in Konkan region, Maharashtra, India

pseudomediofasciatus
Insects described in 1910